, sometimes called Sengokubara, is a district in Hakone, Kanagawa, Japan.

Geography
The district covers a total area of approximately 22 km², and is located in the northern part of the Hakone caldera. The area is designated a part of Fuji-Hakone-Izu National Park, and includes golf courses, cottages, hotels, and Japanese inns.

Mountains

 Mount Kintoki
 Mount Marudake
 Mount Kozuka
 Mount Daigatake

Passes
 Otome Pass
 Nagao Pass
 Kojiri Pass

Rivers
 Haya River

Population
As of October 2010, the district has a population of 4,095, with 1,922 households.

History
Following the Meiji restoration, the village of Sengokuhara was founded in 1889. Together with Yumoto town and the villages Onsen (Gora) and Miyagino it was absorbed into the town of Hakone in September 1956. Kisaku Ishimura, the mayor of Sengokuhara, was elected the first mayor of this enlarged Hakone.

Sightseeing spots
 Hakone Botanical Garden of Wetlands (Shissei-Kaen Bus stop)
 The Little Prince and Saint-Exupéry Museum (Kawamukai Bus stop)
 Hakone Venetian Glass Museum (Venetian Grass Museum / Hyoseki Bus stop)
 Lalique Museum (Sengoku Annaijo Bus stop)
 Pola Museum of Art (Pola Museum Bus stop)
 Susuki grass viewing in autumn (Sengoku-Kogen Bus stop)
 Choan-ji Temple (Sengoku Bus stop)

Access by car
from Odawara: National Route 1 and National Route 138
from Gotemba: National Route 138
from Lake Ashi: Kanagawa Prefectural Route 75

Major bus services
  
 for Tōgendai (Lake Ashi)
 for Hakone Yumoto Station and Odawara Station via Miyanoshita
 for Ten-yu via Gora Station, Kowaki-en and Yunessun
 for Ten-yu via Miyagino, Gora Station, Kowaki-en and Yunessun
 for Shissei-Kaen
 for Gotemba Premium Outlets and JR Gotemba Station
 for Shinjuku Station (Tokyo) via JR Gotemba Station and Tomei-Gotemba
 for Hakone-en, Odakyu Hotel de Yama (next to Hakone Shrine) via Kojiri
  
 for Tōgendai (Lake Ashi)
 for Hakone Yumoto Station and Odawara Station via Miyanoshita
 for Ten-yu via Gōra Station, Kowaki-en and Yunessun
 for Shissei-Kaen
  for Shinjuku Station (Tokyo) via JR Gotemba Station and Tomei-Gotemba
 for Hakone-en, Odakyu Hotel de Yama (next to Hakone Shrine) via Kojiri
 for Haneda Airport via Yokohama Station
  
 for Tōgendai (Lake Ashi)
 for Hakone Yumoto Station and Odawara Station via Miyanoshita
 for Ten-yu via Gora Station, Kowaki-en and Yunessun
 for Shissei-Kaen
  for Shinjuku Station (Tokyo) via JR Gotemba Station and Tomei-Gotemba
 for Hakone-en, Odakyu Hotel de Yama (next to Hakone Shrine) via Kojiri
 for Haneda Airport via JR Yokohama Station

References

External links
 Official Hakone website 
 Sengokuhara area guide (Hakone Ryokan Organization) 

Hakone, Kanagawa